The Embassy of Australia, Egypt in Cairo is the diplomatic mission of Australia in Egypt. It is located in the World Trade Centre Building of Cairo. It is Australia's only diplomatic mission in Egypt.  The ambassador is Mr Neil Hawkins. His appointment was announced 6 March 2015.

See also
List of diplomatic missions of Australia

External links
Official website

References

Egypt
Australia–Egypt relations
Egypt